Popeye the Sailor Meets Sindbad the Sailor is a 1936 two-reel animated cartoon short subject film in the Popeye Color Feature series, produced in Technicolor and released to theatres on November 27, 1936 by Paramount Pictures. It was produced by Max Fleischer for Fleischer Studios, Inc. and directed by Dave Fleischer, with the title song by Sammy Timberg. The voice cast includes Jack Mercer as Popeye and J. Wellington Wimpy, Mae Questel as Olive Oyl and Gus Wickie as Sindbad the Sailor.

In 2004, the film was selected for preservation in the United States National Film Registry by the Library of Congress as being "culturally, historically, or aesthetically significant".

Plot 
In this short, Sindbad the Sailor (who is intended to be an alternate version of Popeye's old nemesis Bluto) lives on an island where he keeps loads of creatures that he had captured during his adventures (lions, tigers, giants, dragons, vultures, snakes, and apes). Where he proclaims himself, in song, to be the greatest sailor, adventurer, and lover in the world and "the most remarkable, extraordinary fellow," a claim that is inadvertently challenged by Popeye as he innocently sings his usual song while sailing by within earshot of Sindbad's island with his girlfriend Olive Oyl and his friend J. Wellington Wimpy on board.

Sindbad orders his huge roc to kidnap Popeye's girlfriend, Olive Oyl, and wreck Popeye's ship, forcing him and Wimpy to swim to shore. Sindbad relishes making Olive his trophy wife, which is interrupted by Popeye's arrival. Sindbad then challenges the one-eyed sailor to a series of obstacles to prove his greatness, including fighting the roc, a two-headed giant named Boola (an apparent parody reference to The Three Stooges), and Sindbad himself. Popeye makes short work of the bird and the giant, but Sindbad almost gets the best of him until Popeye produces his can of spinach, which gives him the power to soundly defeat Sindbad and proclaim himself "the most remarkable, extraordinary fella."

A subtly dark running gag features the hamburger-loving Wimpy chasing after a duck on the island with a meat grinder, with the intention of grinding it up so that he can fry it into his favorite dish, but the duck not only escapes, but also snatches away Wimpy's last burger in retaliation when he gives up.

Production 

Many of the scenes in this short feature make use of the Fleischer's "Steroptical Process", or "Setback Tabletop" process, which used modeled sets to create 3D backgrounds for the cartoon.

Release and reception 
This short was the first of the three Popeye Color Specials, which, at over sixteen minutes each, were billed as "A Popeye Feature."  It was also the first Popeye color cartoon in general. Popeye the Sailor Meets Sindbad the Sailor was nominated for the 1936 Academy Award for Best Short Subject: Cartoons, but lost to Walt Disney's Silly Symphony The Country Cousin. Footage from this short was later used in the 1952 Famous Studios Popeye cartoon Big Bad Sindbad, in which Popeye relates the story of his encounter with Sindbad to his 3 nephews.

The Popeye Color Specials, also including Popeye the Sailor Meets Ali Baba's Forty Thieves, and Aladdin and His Wonderful Lamp (both of which were also adapted from a story featured in One Thousand and One Nights) are in the public domain, and are widely available on home video and DVD, often transferred from poor quality, old, faded prints. A fully restored version with the original Paramount mountain logo opening and closing titles is available on the Popeye the Sailor: 1933-1938, Volume 1 DVD set from Warner Bros.

Producer and special effects artist Ray Harryhausen stated in his Fantasy Film Scrapbook that Popeye the Sailor Meets Sindbad the Sailor was a major influence on his production of The 7th Voyage of Sinbad.

In 1994, the film was voted #17 of the 50 Greatest Cartoons of all time by members of the animation field, making it the highest ranked Fleischer Studios cartoon in the book. In 2004, Popeye the Sailor Meets Sindbad the Sailor has been deemed "culturally significant" by the United States Library of Congress and selected for preservation in the National Film Registry.

References

External links 
 
 
Popeye the Sailor Meets Sindbad The Sailor at the TCM Movie Database
 
 
 Popeye the Sailor Meets Sindbad the Sailor at the Big Cartoon Database

1936 films
1936 animated films
1936 short films
1930s American animated films
1930s color films
American parody films
Fairy tale parody films
1930s fantasy films
Films based on Sinbad the Sailor
Popeye the Sailor theatrical cartoons
1930s children's fantasy films
United States National Film Registry films
Films set on islands
Films about giants
Short films directed by Dave Fleischer
Seafaring films
Animated films about dragons
Articles containing video clips
Paramount Pictures short films
Fleischer Studios short films
Roc (mythology)
1930s English-language films
American comedy short films
American children's fantasy films